Albanian Airlines MAK Sh.p.k (trading as Albanian Airlines) was an airline based in Tirana, Albania. It operated scheduled international services. Its main hub was Tirana International Airport Nënë Tereza. On 11 November 2011 Albania's Civil Aviation Authority revoked the license of Albanian Airlines.

History 
The airline was initially established in May 1991 using Tupolev Tu-134 aircraft and operated under the name of Arberia Airlines. This was the private airline of politicians for communist Albania. The airline was later renamed to Albanian Airlines in May 1992 and started open operations to the public on 20 June 1992. The renamed airline was formed as a joint venture between the Albanian state-owned Albtransport and Tyrolean Airways of Austria. Albanian Airlines operated a single Austrian registered, De Havilland Canada Dash 8-102 (MSN 242, OE-LLI), flown by Canadian pilots and maintained by Canadian Engineers. Tyrolean opted out of the relationship in 1997, taking back the single Dash 8.

Privatisation

Albanian Airlines was privatised in the same year and sold to Kuwait-based M.A. Kharafi & Sons Group.  As a result, it was restructured in 1997 when its operations were based on a single Airbus A320 aircraft leased from Shorouk Air of Egypt. By 2001 it operated a fleet of four Tupolev Tu-134 aircraft on scheduled services from Tirana to Bologna, Frankfurt, Istanbul, Pristina, Rome and Zürich. In July 2001, Albanian Airlines started upgrading its fleet by gradually removing its Tupolev aircraft and acquired its first BAe 146. Two more BAe 146 were added in 2003 and 2004. This upgrading process allowed the company to expand to new strategic markets such as Belgium and Germany.

Advanced Construction Group (ACG) Sh.p.k.

In August 2008, Albanian Airlines was purchased by the Advanced Construction Group (ACG) Sh.p.k. in Tirana, Albania, by the President Yahia Farwati, who purchased 100% of capital from the Kuwaiti-based M.A. Kharafi & Sons Group.

On 14 August 2009, it was announced that Albanian Airlines had been sold to Turkish Even Group, which was purchased by Evsen Group 93% and 7% retained by the Advanced Construction Group.

In March 2012, the 93% of Albanian Airlines shares was returned with a court decision to Advanced Construction Group (ACG) with owner Yahia Farwati. Now, Advanced Construction Group (ACG) owns 100% of its shares.

With this investment came a new logo, addition of destinations, and an addition of aircraft to the existing fleet. In 2009, the carrier saw the addition of aircraft, two Boeing 737 as well as one Boeing 757, all of which were leased from Air Slovakia.

On 9 October 2009, it was announced that Albanian Airlines would soon open new destinations to Paris, Amsterdam, Milan, Rome, Athens, Jeddah, Beijing and later the United States of America. Along with lower rates of travel, the addition of more Fokker 100, and scheduled use of the Boeing 747, such claims fell through due to financial problems, including the repossession of all leased aircraft from Air Slovakia.

Destinations

Fleet

In October 2011, the Albanian Airlines fleet consisted of the following aircraft with an average age of 22.5 years:

See also 
 List of defunct airlines of Albania

References

External links

Official website(website defunct)

Defunct airlines of Albania
Airlines established in 1991
Airlines disestablished in 2011
1991 establishments in Albania
2011 disestablishments in Albania